Celloverse is the third studio album by Croatian cello duo, 2Cellos. It was released on January 9, 2015, in Australia, January 21, 2015, in Japan and February 9, 2015, in the UK.

Track listing

Charts
The album reached number 43 on the UK album chart, their only release to do so.

References

2015 albums
2Cellos albums